Balanivav is a village in Jafrabad Taluka of Amreli district, Gujarat, India. It is about ten miles north of Jafarabad.

History
During British period, it was under the jurisdiction of Junagadh State. It was under Babariawad before taken over by Junagadh.

References

Villages in Amreli district